The 1993 Australian Formula Ford Championship was a CAMS sanctioned Australian motor racing championship for Formula Ford racing cars. It was the 24th national series for Formula Fords to be held in Australia, and the first to carry the Australian Formula Ford Championship name. Promoted as the 1993 Motorcraft Australian Formula Ford Championship, it was won by Craig Lowndes driving a Van Diemen RF93.

Calendar

The championship was contested over an eight round series with two heats per round.

Results

References

External links
 Formula Ford Australia
 Image of championship winner Craig Lowndes driving a Van Diemen RF93, Oran Park, 8 August 1993 - from www.autopics.com.au via www.webcitation.org

Australian Formula Ford Championship seasons
Formula Ford